Paʼa, also known as Afa (Afawa) or Fucaka (autonym), is an Afro-Asiatic language spoken in Bauchi State, Nigeria.

Notes

Further reading
 Margaret Gardner Skinner.  1979.  "Aspects of Pa'anci Grammar," University of Wisconsin PhD dissertation.

Languages of Nigeria
West Chadic languages